Philippe Chamouard, (born 24 February 1952 in Paris) is a French composer of contemporary music.

Publication 
 Mahler tel qu'en lui-même, Éditions Méridiens Klincksieck, 1989; Reprint Éditions Connaissances et savoirs 2006

References

External links 
 Official website

1952 births
Living people
Musicians from Paris
20th-century French composers
21st-century French composers
French male composers
20th-century French male musicians
21st-century French male musicians